Neutral ceramidase B also known as non-lysosomal ceramidase B or N-acylsphingosine amidohydrolase (non-lysosomal ceramidase) 2B or ASAH2B is a ceramidase enzyme which in humans is encoded by the ASAH2B gene.

Clinical significance
ASAH2B  shows reduced expression with increasing age and further reduction in late onset Alzheimer's disease patients.

References

External links

Further reading